Sheyban (also Romanized as Sheybān) is a village in Targavar Rural District, Silvaneh District, Urmia County, West Azerbaijan Province, Iran. At the 2006 census, its population was 364, in 50 families.

References 

Populated places in Urmia County